Charlie Don't Surf is a line from the 1979  war film Apocalypse Now, notably referenced in popular culture. It may refer to:

Television
"Charlie Don't Surf" (Veronica Mars), an episode of season 3 of Veronica Mars
"Charlie Don't Surf", an episode of season 5 of Numbers
"Charlie Don't Surf", an episode of season 1 of The Commish
"Charlie Don't Surf", an episode of Informer

Music
"Charlie Don't Surf", a song by The Clash from the 1980 album Sandinista!
"Charlie Don't Surf", a song by Soul Flower Union from the 2002 album Love ± Zero
"Charlie Don't Surf", a song by Funeral For a Friend from the 2008 album Memory and Humanity

Other uses
"Charlie Don't Surf", a level in the video game Call of Duty 4: Modern Warfare
"Charlie Don't Surf", a sculpture made by Maurizio Cattelan

See also
 China Beach Surf Club, a group of surfing US military members during the Vietnam War